Paruthiveeran is a 2007 Indian Tamil-language romantic drama film written and directed by Ameer. The film stars Karthi in his feature film debut as the title character, with Priyamani as the female lead and Ponvannan, Saravanan, Ganja Karuppu, Sampath Raj, and Sujatha Sivakumar playing supporting roles. Produced by Studio Green, it features a soundtrack and score composed by Yuvan Shankar Raja, cinematography by Ramji and editing by Raja Mohammad.

Paruthiveeran was entirely shot in Madurai and its surroundings. After two years of making, the film was released on 23 February 2007 and received universal critical acclaim. The female lead of this film Priyamani has won the National Film Award for Best Actress (2006) for her brilliant and intense performance as a gang rape victim. In this film Priyamani's voice modulation and the dialogue delivery in Madurai Tamil accent is considered as the finest performance output given by an actress in the Tamil film industry till date. The film won prizes at major film award ceremonies in India, including two National Film Awards, six Filmfare Awards South and two Tamil Nadu State Film Awards, among others, whilst being screened at several international film festivals such as the Berlin International Film Festival and the Osian's Cinefan Festival of Asian and Arab Cinema as well. It also emerged a huge commercial success, running successfully for more than one year in theatres.

Plot 
The story is set in a rural area around Madurai in the village called Paruthiyur, which still practices caste segregation.

Paruthiveeran  is a country brash whose inter-caste parents were ostracized by the villagers since his upper caste [Agamudayar] father married his lower caste[Irula] mother. After his parents' death, Paruthiveeran was mostly raised by his doting paternal uncle Chevvaazhai, who pampers and accompanies him in every misbehavior to keep him happy. Having grown up among his mother's people, he is often arrested for petty crimes. His one ambition in life is to gain enough notoriety to be on TV news and to be thrown into Madras Jail. He often bullies Paruthiyur villagers for money and fun.

Paruthiveeran's cross cousin Muththazhagu is the daughter of his snobbish uncle who is a respected member of the village's council and a caste sectarian. Muththazhagu has been in love with Paruthiveeran since childhood, but he remains unmoved and keeps her at bay. When they were children, Paruthiveeran saved Muththazhagu from drowning in a well. She promised to marry him and be by his side forever and starts to love him against her parents' will as they do not approve of Parututhiveeran's inter-caste background. In order to delay her marriage with anybody else, she fails in her tests at school on purpose to be in the same grade class as Paruthiveeran. At times, Paruthiveeran is violent towards her, but she still loves him. When Paruthiveeran finally accepts Muththazhagu's love for him and decides to marry her, the feud between the two families comes in the way.

Determined to marry Muththazhagu, he warns her against marrying anyone else by threatening to cut her into pieces. Undeterred by his threats, her parents press ahead with the preparations for her marriage with a boy of their choice. Since Muththazhagu is not able to convince her parents otherwise, she runs away from home in order to elope with Paruthiveeran. However, while hiding away in an abandoned building while Paruthiveeran is away making necessary arrangements, she comes across four of Paruthiveeran's acquaintances who mistake her for one of his prostitutes. They brutally gang rape her and leave her to die.

Later, Paruthiveeran returns and finds her dying. She beseeches Paruthiveeran to cut her into pieces as she does not want anybody to find her in her present state. Paruthiveeran, on her request, chops her corpse into pieces. While walking away in a neurotic state, he is found by Muththazhagu's father Kazhuvathevan  and her other relatives. Assuming him to be her kidnapper and killer, they beat him to death.

Cast 

 Karthi as Paruthiveeran
 Priyamani as Muththazhagu
 Ponvannan as Kazhuva Servai (Muththazhagu's father)
 Saravanan as Chevvaazhaikannu Thevar (Paruthiveeran's uncle)
 Sujatha Sivakumar as Kazhuva Thevar's wife
 Ganja Karuppu as Douglas
 Sampath Raj as Marudhu Thevar (Paruthiveeran's father)
 Panjavarnam as Mangayee
 Ammulu as Kuraththi
 Sevvazhairaj as Ponanthinni
 Mu Ramaswamy as Singer in Iyyayo song
 Mathan Thivagaran as uncredited Role
 Samuthirakani (Cameo appearance – uncredited)

Production

Casting
For the title character, Karthi was chosen to portray the part. Although Karthi revealed he preferred directing to acting, he agreed to take up acting since his father convinced him to do so. When director Ameer approached him to play the titular character in the film he accepted the offer because the film was " ... so compelling".

About 60 debutants, mostly real-time people from the region, appeared in the film. The number of newcomers who acted in the film, notably, outweighed the number of professional artists, with Priyamani, Ponvannan, Saravanan and Ganja Karuppu being the only four experienced actors. Furthermore, no dubbing artists were involved in the production and all artists were brought to Chennai had dubbed their original voice.

Filming
Filming was held at various locations that, according to Ameer, were never before explored by Tamil cinema. A village carnival was created by art director Jacki for the film and shot for 10 days in Karumathur, Madurai. The filming started in July 2005 and experienced financial difficulties, and was almost abandoned by mid–2006. The film's director Ameer taking over the production and later by Gnanavel Raja. He later stated that he had incurred heavy financial loss as a producer of the film.

Music 

The film's score as well as the soundtrack were scored by Yuvan Shankar Raja, teaming up with his friend Ameer following two successive successful collaborations in Mounam Pesiyadhe (2002) and Raam (2005). The soundtrack album was released on 29 Decrember 2006 at Green Park Hotel in Chennai, with several prominent film personalities participating in the event, including fellow actor Vijay, who launched the audio. The album consists of six songs, including one instrumental track, featuring the nadaswaram only. It features vocals from Yuvan Shankar Raja's father Ilaiyaraaja, director Ameer himself and professional playback singers Shreya Ghoshal, Manikka Vinayagam and Madhumitha. Moreover, a couple of traditional, village-based singers contributed to the album by lending their voice to a few songs. All lyrics were written by Snehan. Paruthiveeran was notably the first ever entirely village-based film Yuvan Shankar Raja had scored music for. He composed a folk music-based score and used rural sounds with instruments as dholak, nadaswaram, thavil and urumee.

Yuvan Shankar Raja received critical acclaim for his score, while the soundtrack album initially got mostly unfavorable reviews, being described as a "letdown" and "disappointment", raising to question whether it could attract today's "modern" audience. Following the film's release however, critics unanimously made very positive remarks in regards to the film score. Baradwaj Rangan labelled it a "magnificently earthy score", while Malathi Rangarajan noted that the composer "proves he is a chip off the old block in rustic music too". Other critics hailed his music as "excellent", and as "unmistakably a milestone on his road to the pinnacle that his father Ilayaraja has reached". Due to its successful run at the box office, the songs enjoyed popularity as well, particularly among the younger generation. The song "Oororam Puliyamaram" in particular was the Chartbuster number, also being chosen as the "Best Folk Song of the Year 2007" at the Isaiyaruvi Tamil Music Awards, whilst the entire album itself was named as "Isaiyaruvi Best Album of the Year 2007".

Release 
The film was released on 23 February 2007. It was later dubbed into Hindi as Meri Awargi.

Home Video
Paruthiveeran was released on DVD by AP International in 2013.

Reception 
Sriram Iyer of Rediff gave the film three out of five stars, lauding it as a "remarkable effort" and claiming that Ameer "successfully brings alive the feel of the pastures". The reviewer appreciated the cast and crew, describing Karthi's performance as "excellent", while citing that Saravanan "excels" and Priyamani had done "a fairly good job in her deglamourised role". A Behindwoods critic wrote that Paruthiveeran "lives up to all that it promised and more". Heaping praise on the director, the reviewer further adds that Ameer had "shown his class again" and "enhance[d] his reputation as a master craftsman". Russell Edwards of Variety cited, "rough production values are mitigated by a myriad of sophisticated cinematic techniques that show this is no boondocks effort. Fests that appreciate curry flavors will eat this one up, though uninitiated aud[ience]s could experience culture shock". Furthermore, he noted that Ameer's "creative helming, which includes split-screen, appears unbridled and sometimes outright chaotic, but always serves the script", while writing that performances were "consistent with the bombastic storytelling". A reviewer from nowrunning.com called the film a "gripping tale narrated with a skill and imagination which only directors like Amir are endowed with", rating it three out of five.

Baradwaj Rangan called Paruthiveeran a "classic, one for the ages" and a "showcase for how good filmmaking can (almost) overcome mediocre material", while noting that Karthi gave "a superb first-film performance by any standard, and it makes you reach for that oldest of movie-myth cliches: A star is born." Other critics have offered criticism of the violence and brutality of some sequences in the film. A Sify critic wrote that it was "undoubtedly [...] a brave film and full credit goes to the director for making every scene realistic and characters life-like", while criticizing that Ameer's script was "too thin on logic" and the climax "too heavy, dark and morbid." However, in regards to the performances, the reviewer, too, heaped praise on the actors, describing Karthi as "spectacular" and Saravanan as "terrific" and adding that Priya Mani "... steals the show with her spontaneity and authenticity". Malathi Rangarajan of The Hindu claimed that the film was "the genuine depiction of village life" that "transports you to the era of classics in a rustic ambience, Bharatiraaja style", further citing that "all the same, when graphic pictures of gang rape and killing in cold blood dominate, things becomes too much to stomach" and that Ameer "only creates the impression that village folks as a whole are a belligerent lot."

Box office 
Released on 23 February 2007, Paruthiveeran faced competition from Mozhi, which was released on the same day. The film took a big opening at the Chennai box office, collecting 3.69 crore from 92 prints in Tamil Nadu in its opening weekend. The film continued to rank at first at the Chennai box office for five successive weeks, being ousted only by the Hollywood production 300 during the Easter weekend. At the end of its run, the film had reportedly grossed a share 15 crore at the box office, being declared one of the most commercially successful Tamil films of the year.

Accolades 
The film and many of its cast and crew have been awarded or nominated by many associations in India and worldwide for the film. Notably, Priyamani has won the Best Actress prizes at all awards ceremonies. Paruthiveeran was honoured with the "Special Mention" award from the Network for the Promotion of Asian Cinema (NETPAC) at the 58th Berlin International Film Festival. The film was screened five times at the Berlin Film Festival in two German subtitled versions and three English subtitled versions.

2006 National Film Awards (India)
 Silver Lotus Award – Best Actress – Priyamani
 Silver Lotus Award – Best Editor – Raja Mohammad

2007 Osian's Cinefan Festival of Asian and Arab Cinema
 Best Film Award – Paruthiveeran - Ameer Sultan
 Best Actress Award – Priyamani

2008 Berlin International Film Festival (Germany)
 Netpac Award – Special Mention – Ameer

2006 Tamil Nadu State Film Awards
 Tamil Nadu State Film Award for Best Film – Second Prize
 Best Actress – Priyamani
 Special Prize – Actor – Karthi

2007 Cinema Journalists Association Awards
 Best Film – Paruthiveeran
 Best Director – Ameer
 Best Actress – Priyamani

2007 Filmfare Awards South (India)
 Best Film – Tamil – Paruthiveeran
 Best Director – Tamil – Ameer 
 Best Actor – Tamil – Karthi
 Best Actress – Tamil – Priyamani
 Best Supporting Actor – Tamil – Saravanan
 Best Supporting Actress – Tamil – Sujatha Sivakumar
 Nominated – Filmfare Award for Best Music Direction– Tamil – Yuvan Shankar Raja

2007 Vijay Awards
 Best Film – Paruthiveeran
 Best Actress – Priyamani
 Best Supporting Actress – Sujatha
 Best Debut Actor – Karthi
 Nominated – Best Director – Ameer 
 Nominated – Best Supporting Actor – Saravanan
 Nominated – Best Music Director – Yuvan Shankar Raja
 Nominated – Best Cinematographer – Ramji
 Nominated – Best Editor – Raja Mohammed
 Nominated – Best Art Director – Jackson
 Nominated – Best Lyricist – Snehan
 Nominated – Best Story-Screenplay Writer – Ameer

Controversy 
There was a controversy surrounding the ownership of the movie. Ameer has complained that the original producer K. E. Gnanavel Raja, couldn't finance the movie till its completion, so he supposedly gave up the movie to Ameer. But towards the completion of the movie, Ameer ran out of funds and the movie went back to Gnanavel. Since the release of the movie, both parties have been accusing each other for failing to make a payment which each owes from the other.

References

External links 
 
 

2007 drama films
Films featuring a Best Actress National Award-winning performance
2007 films
Indian drama films
Films shot in Madurai
Films directed by Ameer (director)
Films scored by Yuvan Shankar Raja
2000s Tamil-language films
Films about rape in India
Films whose editor won the Best Film Editing National Award